Stabenow is a surname. Notable people with the surname include:

Dana Stabenow (born 1952), American author
Debbie Stabenow (born 1950), American politician

German-language surnames